Gary McCartney (born 15 August 1960) is a retired Northern Irish footballer who played for Linfield and Crusaders during their successful 1990s period. He later went on to manage the Crues' during the 2000/01 season, before resigning from his post, citing lack of funds.
He is not Glentoran legend Gary MacCartney!

References

External links

1960 births
Living people
Association footballers from Northern Ireland
Crusaders F.C. players
Crusaders F.C. managers
Glentoran F.C. players
NIFL Premiership players
Association footballers not categorized by position
Football managers from Northern Ireland